Paul Claes (born 30 October 1943) is a Flemish scholar, writer, poet and translator.

Born in Leuven, Claes graduated in classical literature and Germanic philology (Dutch and English). He obtained a PhD in 1981, with a dissertation De mot zit in de mythe on references to classical texts in the works of Hugo Claus. He worked at the Katholieke Universiteit Leuven and the Catholic University of Nijmegen.

He wrote the script for Reynaert de Vos (1973-1974), a satirical newspaper comic based on Reynard the Fox, drawn by hugOKÉ. 

Claes made his debut as a poet in 1983 with sonnets in De zonen van de zon. His translation of T.S. Eliot's "The Waste Land" (2007) includes a comprehensive commentary and a new interpretation. "La clef des Illuminations" (2008) is a new interpretation of Arthur Rimbaud's masterpiece. "Concatenatio Catulliana" (2002) proposes a new theory about the arrangement of Catullus' "Carmina".

 Het netwerk en de nevelvlek (1979)
 De zonen van de zon (1983)
 Claus-reading (1984)
 De mot zit in de mythe (1984)
 'Hans Favery. Een (de)constructie' (1985)
 De Kwadratuur van de Onyx (1986)
 Claus quadrifrons (1987)
 Echo's echo's. De kunst van de allusie (1988)
 Rebis (1989)
 Het laatste boek (1992)
 De Sater (1993)
 Gezelle gelezen (1993 [i.e. 1992])
 Embleem (1994)
 Mimicry (1994)
 Raadsels van Rilke (1995)
 De zoon van de Panter (1996)
 De phoenix (1998)
 De gulden tak (2000)
 Glans (2000)
 De kameleon (2001)
 Het Hart van de Schorpioen (2002)
 De Lezer (2003)
 Lily (2003)
 Sfinx (2004)
 Psyche (2006)
 Plastic Love (2013)
 De haas en de regenboog (2016)

Awards
 1984 - Prijs voor de Kunstkritiek
 1985 - Literaire Prijs van de stad Antwerpen
 1991 - Driejaarlijkse Belgische Staatsprijs voor het essay
 1996 - Martinus Nijhoff prijs
 2002 - Multatuli Prize

See also
 Flemish literature

Sources

 Paul Claes (in Dutch)
 Paul Claes (in Dutch)

1943 births
Living people
Flemish writers
Belgian comics writers
Belgian translators
Dutch–English translators
English–Dutch translators
French–Dutch translators
Latin–Dutch translators
Translators of Ancient Greek texts
Writers from Leuven
KU Leuven alumni
Academic staff of KU Leuven
Academic staff of Radboud University Nijmegen